Labyrintha is a genus of lichenized fungi within the Lecideaceae family. This is a monotypic genus, containing the single species Labyrintha implexa.

References

External links
Labyrintha at Index Fungorum

Lichen genera
Lecideales genera
Lecideales